Chrysocrambus chrysonuchelloides is a moth in the family Crambidae. It was described by Rothschild in 1925. It is found in Morocco.

References

Crambinae
Moths described in 1925